Brachionidae is a family of rotifers belonging to the order Ploima. Species are found in freshwater and marine habitats.

Description 
Rotifers in the family Brachionidae range from 170 to 250 μm, and possess a lorica. The lorica is in a single piece and lacks any furrows, groovese, sulci, or dorsal head shields.

The family contains seven genera:
 Anuraeopsis Lauterborn, 1900
 Brachionus Pallas, 1766 (incl. Schizocerca)
 Kellicottia Ahlstrom, 1938
 Keratella Bory de St.Vincent, 1822
 Notholca Gosse, 1886
 Plationus Segers, Murugan & Dumont, 1993
 Platyias Harring, 1913

References

 
Rotifer families
Ploima